"Não tem solução" is a 1952 Portuguese-language song, a samba-canção, by Dorival Caymmi and :pt:Carlos Guinle. The song was released by Caymmi as a single on Odeon in 1952. Afterwards Dick Farney taught the song to Frankie Laine, who recorded it for his album Foreign Affair in 1958.

References

1952 songs
Songs written by Dorival Caymmi